The following is a list of notable events and releases of the year 1977 in Norwegian music.

Events

April
 1 – The 4th Vossajazz started in Voss, Norway (April 1 – 3).

May
 25
 The 25th Bergen International Festival started in Bergen, Norway (May 25 – June 8).
 The 5th Nattjazz started in Bergen, Norway (May 25 – June 8).

June
 26 – The 8th Kalvøyafestivalen started at Kalvøya near by Oslo.

September
 11 – The 9th Kalvøyafestivalen started at Kalvøya near by Oslo.

Albums released

Unknown date

A
 Arild Andersen
 Shimri (ECM Records)

E
 Jan Eggum
 Heksedans (Columbia Records)

F
 Flying Norwegians
 Live (Sonet Records)

G
 Jan Garbarek
 Dis (ECM Records)
 Haakon Graf
 Blow Out (Compendium Records) with Sveinung Hovensjø, Jon Eberson and Jon Christensen

K
 Karin Krog
 But Three's A Crowd (Bluebell Records), with Red Mitchell
 As You Are (The Malmö Sessions) (RCA Victor), with Nils Lindberg
 A Song For You (Phontastic Records), with Bengt Hallberg

R
 Inger Lise Rypdal
 Tider Kommer-Tider Går (Talent Records)

T
 Jahn Teigen
 Teigen's Tivoli (Polydor Records)
 Pål Thowsen
 No Time For Time (Zarepta Records), with Jon Christensen, Terje Rypdal, and Arild Andersen
 Radka Toneff
 Winter Poem (Zarepta Records)

V
 Jan Erik Vold
 Ingentings Bjeller (Polydor Records), with Jan Garbarek-Bobo Stenson Quartet

Deaths

 February
 8 – Eivind Groven, composer and music critic (born 1901).
 11 – Trygve Torjussen (91), composer and pianist (born 1885).

 October
 18 – Kristian Hauger, pianist, orchestra leader and composer of popular music (born 1905).

Births

 January
 8 – Torun Eriksen, jazz singer.
 25 – Christian Ingebrigtsen, singer-songwriter and musician (A1).
 28 – Sissel Vera Pettersen, Norwegian singer, saxophonist, and composer.
 31 – Per Zanussi, jazz upright bassist and composer.

February
 4 – Emil Nikolaisen, multi-instrumentalist and music producer.
 10 – Mads Hauge,  songwriter and record producer.
 12 – Ruben Sverre Gjertsen, contemporary composer.
 19 – Andre Lindal, songwriter, record producer and musician.

March
 1 – Sven Atle "Silenoz" Kopperud, black metal guitarist (Dimmu Borgir).
 6 – Kirsti Huke, jazz singer and composer.
 10 – Torstein Lofthus, jazz/prog rock drummer and composer.
 26 – Håvard Stubø, jazz guitarist and composer.
 30 – Tor Egil Kreken, jazz guitarist, bassist, and banjo player (Wibutee).

April
 5 – Håkon Kornstad, jazz saxophonist and operatic tenor (Wibutee).
 28 – Asbjørn Lerheim, jazz guitarist and music teacher.
 30 – Ole Jørn Myklebust, jazz trumpeter.

May
 16 – Erik Faber, pop/rock singer-songwriter.
 23 – Mads Berven, jazz guitarist.
 28 – Trond Bråthen, black metal singer-songwriter, guitarist and bassist (died 2012).

 June
 2 – Helena Iren Michaelsen, rock singer.
 8 – Frøy Aagre, jazz saxophonist.
 9 – Atle Nymo, jazz saxophonist and bass clarinetist.
 19 – Anne Nørdsti, singer.
 22 – Gunilla Süssmann, classical pianist.
 30
 Brynjar Rasmussen, jazz clarinetist.
 Kjersti Horn, theater director and storyboard artist.

August
 5 – Terje Winterstø Røthing, rock guitarist.
 7 – Deeyah Khan, singer, music producer, composer, film director, and human rights defender.
 14 – Pål Mathiesen, musician and vocalist (Susperia).
 18 – Even Kruse Skatrud, jazz trombonist, composer, music arranger and orchestra leader.
 28 – Arve Isdal, black metal guitarist and producer.
 31 – Cornelius Jakhelln, vocalist, guitarist, and poet.

September
 13 – Julius Lind, jazz and rock double bassist.
 20 – Martin Horntveth, drummer, composer and electronica artist (Jaga Jazzist).
 23 – Olav Iversen, heavy metal composer, guitarist and singer.
 27 – Tor Magne Glidje, guitarist (Extol).

 October
 2 – David Wallumrød, jazz pianist and organist.

 November
 1 – Anine Kruse, singer  and choral conductor.
 19 – Anne Lilia Berge Strand, singer, songwriter, record producer and DJ.
 27 – Ivar Bjørnson, black metal guitarist and composer (Enslaved).

 December
 4 – Morten Veland, death metal multi-instrumentalist, composer, songwriter, and producer (Tristania, Sirenia and Mortemia).
 23 – Tore Johansen, jazz trumpeter.

 Unknown date
 Andreas Haddeland, jazz guitarist.
 Christer Espevoll, rock guitarist.
 Even Granås, drummer and guitarist.

See also
 1977 in Norway
 Music of Norway
 Norway in the Eurovision Song Contest 1977

References

 
Norwegian music
Norwegian
Music
1970s in Norwegian music